The Dwekh Nawsha (literally "one who sacrifices") was a Christian military organization created in June 2014 in order to defend Iraq's Assyrian population from the Islamic State of Iraq and the Levant (ISIL), and possibly retake their lands currently controlled by ISIL. The militia defends the Christian cities in the Nineveh province of the historical Assyria region.

The Dwekh Nawsha operates in coordination with the regional and international security forces.

Despite being led by the Assyrian Patriotic Party, most militiamen are not members of the party. Several Christian foreign fighters have joined the Dwekh Nawsha; they include Americans, French, British and Australians.

Sons of Liberty International, who had previously trained the Nineveh Plain Protection Units, announced in fall 2015 that they will begin training Dwekh Nawsha in their fight against ISIL.

A report by the Assyrian Policy Institute released in June 2020 claimed that Dwekh Nawsha was eventually disbanded and that all of its social media accounts have been deleted.

See also 

Nineveh Plain Protection Units
 List of armed groups in the Iraqi Civil War

References

External links
Westerners join Iraqi Christian militia to fight Islamic State in Iraq – ANI
Former US soldier joins militia to defend Christian faith in Iraq – PBS

2014 establishments in Iraq
Anti-ISIL factions in Iraq
Assyrian organizations
Iraqi insurgency (2011–2013)
War in Iraq (2013–2017)
Military units and formations established in 2014
Military wings of nationalist parties
Paramilitary forces of Iraq